Keali'i Blaisdell is an American musician whose popularity has drawn thousands of fans to his appearances. His 1996 release; "Ka Ulu Mae'ole" sold well at many island music stores and was played heavily on radio stations in Maui and Kaua'i.

Blaisdell is a multiple Na Hoku Hanohano Finalist (Hawaiian Academy of Recording Arts) for Most Promising Artist and Hawaiian Language Performance, Hawaiian slack key guitarist, recording artist, and music composer. He is known as a prolific composer of the Native Hawaiian music genre with over 130 original Traditional Hawaiian Songs and a Native Hawaiian Activist.

References

External links
1999 Na Hoku Hanohano Award Nominees / Honolulu Star Bulletin
2007 Na Hoku Hanohano Award Finalist / Nahenahe.net
Huapala.org
Hula Records
Pacific Hawaiian Music 
Hawaiian Concert Guide / Stroke

Native Hawaiian musicians
Living people
1972 births
Musicians from Honolulu